The Sweden national under-21 football team is the football team representing Sweden in competitions for under-21 year old players and is controlled by the Swedish Football Association. The Swedish U21 team came into existence, following the realignment of UEFA European Under-23 Championship, which changed to be an Under-21 competition in 1978.

Sweden made their first European Under-21 Championship appearance in 1986. In 2015, Sweden became champions for the first time. They finished second in 1992 and they also reached the semi-finals in 1990 and 2009. Oscar Hiljemark is the most capped player for the Swedish U21 team, having played 37 caps between 2011 and 2015. Ola Toivonen and Carlos Strandberg are the best goalscorers for the Swedish U21 team, having scored 13 goals each.

Competitive record
 Champions   Runners-up   Third place   Fourth place   Tournament held on home soil

UEFA European U-23 Championship

UEFA European U-21 Championship

Players

Current squad
The following 22 players have been called up for the friendly matches against Scotland and Colombia on 23 and 26 March 2023, respectively.

Caps and goals updated as of 20 November 2022.

Recent call-ups
The following 18 players are still eligible for the U21 team (i.e. born in 2002 or later) and have previously been called up to the Sweden U21 squad.

Previous squads
 1998 UEFA European Under-21 Championship squad
 2004 UEFA European Under-21 Championship squad
 2009 UEFA European Under-21 Championship squad
 2015 UEFA European Under-21 Championship squad
 2017 UEFA European Under-21 Championship squad

Players with most caps and goals

Updated as of 7 June 2018. Note that the matches played by Sweden Olympic football team in 1992 and 2016 are included here, as the Swedish Football Association recognizes them as Under-21 matches.

Top 10 most capped players

Top 10 goalscorers

See also
 Sweden national football team
 Sweden Olympic football team
 Sweden national under-20 football team
 Sweden national under-19 football team
 Sweden national under-17 football team
 Sweden national football B team (defunct)
 UEFA European Under-21 Championship

References

External links

Official website

 
European national under-21 association football teams